The Women's 15 kilometre individual biathlon competition of the Sochi 2014 Olympics was held at Laura Biathlon & Ski Complex on 14 February 2014.

Schedule
All times are (UTC+4).

Results
The race was started at 18:00.

On 27 November 2017, IOC disqualified Yana Romanova for doping violations.

References

Individual